The Kingdom of Sardinia sided with France, Britain and the Ottoman Empire against Russia during the Crimean War (October 1853 – February 1856) and sent an expeditionary force to the Crimea in 1855.

King Victor Emmanuel II and his prime minister, Count Camillo di Cavour, decided to side with Britain and France in order to gain favour in the eyes of those powers at the expense of Austria, which had refused to join the war against Russia.
Sardinia committed a total of 18,000 troops under Lieutenant General Alfonso Ferrero La Marmora to the Crimean Campaign.
Cavour aimed to gain the favour of the French regarding the issue of uniting Italy in a war against the Austrian Empire. The deployment of Italian troops to the Crimea, and the gallantry shown by them in the Battle of the Chernaya (16 August 1855) and in the siege of Sevastopol (1854–1855), allowed the Kingdom of Sardinia to attend the peace negotiatiatons for ending the war at the Congress of Paris (1856), where Cavour could raise the issue of the Risorgimento with the European great powers.

Order of Battle of the Expeditionary Corps
A total of 18,061 men and 3,963 horses and mules embarked in April 1855 on British and Sardinian ships in the harbor of Genoa. While the infantry of the line and cavalry units were drawn from soldiers, who had volunteered for the expedition, the Bersaglieri, artillery and sapper troops were dispatched from their regular units. I.e. each of the army's 10 regular Bersaglieri battalions dispatched its first two companies for the expedition, while i.e. the 1st Battalion of the 2nd Provisional Regiment consisted of volunteers from the army's 3rd Line Infantry Regiment. The corps disembarked at Balaklava between 9 May and 14 May 1855.

Staff 
 Expeditionary Corps Commander in Chief: Lieutenant General Alfonso Ferrero La Marmora
 Chief of Staff: Lieutenant Colonel Petiti Di Roreto
 Staff Major: Major Giuseppe Govone 
 Artillery Staff Major: Major Della Rovere
 Commander, Artillery: Colonel Valfre Di Bonzo
 Commander, Engineers: Major Staglieno
 Commander, Bersaglieri: Lieutenant Colonel De Saint Pierre
 Commander, Support Services: Major General Paolo Antonio de Cavero (until 17 August 1855, then handled by Major Della Rovere after, De Cavero took over the Reserve Brigade when its commander Major General Giorgio Ansaldi died)
 Commander, Medical Services: Dr. Comisetti
 Garrison Commander Balaklava: Lieutenant Colonel Della Chiesa Della Torre
 Garrison Commander Constantinople: Lieutenant Colonel Paolucci
 British Liaison officer: Colonel George Cadogan
 French Liaison officer: Capitaine le Duc de Dino Talleyrand-Périgord

Staff Units 
 Provisional Light Cavalry Regiment (Colonel De Savoiroux)
 Regimental Staff, from the Regiment "Cavalleggeri di Alessandria"
 1st Squadron - 1st Squadron of the Regiment "Cavalleggeri di Novara"
 2nd Squadron - 1st Squadron of the Regiment "Cavalleggeri di Aosta"
 3rd Squadron - 1st Squadron of the Regiment "Cavalleggeri di Saluzzo" 
 4th Squadron - 1st Squadron of the Regiment "Cavalleggeri di Monferrato" 
 5th Squadron - 1st Squadron of the Regiment "Cavalleggeri di Alessandria"
 Provisional Fortress (Coastal) Artillery Battalion (Major Marabotto)
 1st Fortress Artillery Battery, from the 1st Fortress Artillery Brigade
 2nd Fortress Artillery Battery, from the 1st Fortress Artillery Brigade
 7th Fortress Artillery Battery, from the 2nd Fortress Artillery Brigade
 8th Fortress Artillery Battery, from the 2nd Fortress Artillery Brigade
 Mixed Artillery Workers Company, providing maintenance support for the corps' artillery guns (Captain Maraldi)
 Provisional Sappers Battalion (Major Serra) with troops from the Army's Sappers Regiment
 1st Sappers Company
 2nd Sappers Company
 6th Sappers Company
 7th Sappers Company
 Army Train, providing logistic support to the corps (Captain Raimondi)
 1st Army Train Company
 2nd Army Train Company
 Carabinieri Detachment, 50 men providing headquarters security

Combat Forces 
 1st Division (Lieutenant General Giovanni Durando)
 II Brigade (Major General Manfredo Fanti)
 2nd Provisional Regiment (Lieutenant Colonel Beretta)
 1st Battalion, with troops from the 3rd Infantry Regiment, Brigade "Piemonte" (Major Gibbone)
 2nd Battalion, with troops from the 4th Infantry Regiment, Brigade "Piemonte" (Major Garavelli)
 3rd Battalion, with troops from the 5th Infantry Regiment, Brigade "Aosta" (Major Brignone)
 4th Battalion, with troops from the 6th Infantry Regiment, Brigade "Aosta" (Major Regis)
 II Bersaglieri Battalion (Major Bonardelli)
 9th Bersaglieri Company, from the III Bersaglieri Battalion
 10th Bersaglieri Company, from the III Bersaglieri Battalion
 13th Bersaglieri Company, from the IV Bersaglieri Battalion
 14th Bersaglieri Company, from the IV Bersaglieri Battalion
 7th Field Artillery Battery with 6x guns (Captain Melli)
 III Brigade (Major General Enrico Cialdini)
 3rd Provisional Regiment (Lieutenant Colonel DeRossi)
 1st Battalion, with troops from the 7th Infantry Regiment, Brigade "Cuneo" (Major Longoni)
 2nd Battalion, with troops from the 8th Infantry Regiment, Brigade "Cuneo" (Major Corte)
 3rd Battalion, with troops from the 13th Infantry Regiment, Brigade "Pinerolo" (Major Baleno)
 4th Battalion, with troops from the 14th Infantry Regiment, Brigade "Pinerolo" (Major Berberis)
 III Bersaglieri Battalion (Major Bertaldi)
 17th Bersaglieri Company, from the V Bersaglieri Battalion
 18th Bersaglieri Company, from the V Bersaglieri Battalion
 21st Bersaglieri Company, from the VI Bersaglieri Battalion
 22nd Bersaglieri Company, from the VI Bersaglieri Battalion
 10th Field Artillery Battery with 6x guns (Captain Quaglia)
 2nd Division (Lieutenant General Ardigo Trotti, after the division's first commander Lieutenant General Alessandro Ferrero La Marmora had died on 7 June 1855)
 IV Brigade (Major General Rodolfo Gabrielli di Montevecchio)
 4th Provisional Regiment (Lieutenant Colonel Caminati)
 1st Battalion, with troops from the 9th Infantry Regiment, Brigade "Regina" (Major Durandi)
 2nd Battalion, with troops from the 10th Infantry Regiment, Brigade "Regina" (Major Solaro)
 3rd Battalion, with troops from the 15th Infantry Regiment, Brigade "Savona"(Major Valacca)
 4th Battalion, with troops from the 16th Infantry Regiment, Brigade "Savona"(Major Corporandi)
 IV Bersaglieri Battalion (Major Della Chiesa)
 25th Bersaglieri Company, from the VII Bersaglieri Battalion
 26th Bersaglieri Company, from the VII Bersaglieri Battalion
 29th Bersaglieri Company, from the VIII Bersaglieri Battalion
 30th Bersaglieri Company, from the VIII Bersaglieri Battalion
 13th Field Artillery Battery with 6x guns (Captain Ricotti-Magnan)
 V Brigade (Major General Filiberto Mollard)
 5th Provisional Regiment (Lieutenant Colonel Leotardi)
 1st Battalion, with troops from the 11th Infantry Regiment, Brigade "Casale" (Major Alberti)
 2nd Battalion, with troops from the 12th Infantry Regiment, Brigade "Casale" (Major Bigaro Di Vische)
 3rd Battalion, with troops from the 17th Infantry Regiment, Brigade "Acqui" (Major Ferrero)
 4th Battalion, with troops from the 18th Infantry Regiment, Brigade "Acqui" (Major Cadorna)
 V Bersaglieri Battalion (Major Cassinis)
 33rd Bersaglieri Company, from the IX Bersaglieri Battalion
 34th Bersaglieri Company, from the IX Bersaglieri Battalion
 37th Bersaglieri Company, from the X Bersaglieri Battalion
 38th Bersaglieri Company, from the X Bersaglieri Battalion
 16th Field Artillery Battery with 6x guns (Major Baudi di Vesme)

Reserve Forces 
 Reserve Brigade (Major General Paolo Antonio de Cavero)
 1st Provisional Regiment (Colonel Giustiniani)
 1st Battalion with troops from the 1st Grenadier Regiment, of the "Granatieri di Sardegna" Brigade (Major Gozani Di Treville)
 2nd Battalion with troops from the 2nd Grenadier Regiment, of the "Granatieri di Sardegna" Brigade (Major Incisa Di San Stefano)
 3rd Battalion with troops from the 1st Infantry Regiment, of the "Savoia" Brigade (Major De Faverges)
 4th Battalion with troops from the 2nd Infantry Regiment, of the "Savoia" Brigade (Major De Courten)
 I Bersaglieri Battalion (Major Ricadati Di Primeglio)
 1st Bersaglieri Company from the I Bersaglieri Battalion
 2nd Bersaglieri Company from the I Bersaglieri Battalion
 5th Bersaglieri Company from the II Bersaglieri Battalion
 6th Bersaglieri Company from the II Bersaglieri Battalion
 Reserve Artillery Brigade (Major Campana)
 1st Field Artillery Battery with 6x guns (Captain Celesia)
 4th Field Artillery Battery with 6x guns (Captain Avogadro Di Valdengo)

Naval Division 
The naval division consisted of 11 warships and 7 transport ships, with 2,574 men and 126 naval guns.

Staff 
 Naval Division Commander: 1st rank Ship-of-the-line Captain Orazio Di Negro
 Chief of Staff: Corvette Captain Boyl di Putifigari
 Flag Adjutant: 1st rank Ship-of-the-line Lieutenant Pagliacciu Suni
 Harbour Commander Balaklava, 1st rank Ship-of-the-line Lieutenant Ferrero La Marmora
 Harbour Commander Constantinople Major De Rey

Combat ships 
Combat ships:
 "Carlo Alberto" steam frigate of the 1st rank and flagship (1st rank Ship-of-the-line Captain Ceva di Nuceto)
 "Governolo" steam frigate of the 2nd rank (1st rank Ship-of-the-line Captain Albini)
 "Costituzione" steam frigate of the 2nd rank (2nd rank Ship-of-the-line Captain Ineisa di Camerano)
 "Tripoli" steam corvette of the 2nd rank (Corvette Captain Lomaglio)
 "Monzambano" steam corvette of the 2nd rank (Corvette Captain De Viry)
 "Malfatano" steam corvette of the 2nd rank (Corvette Captain Provana del Sabbione)
 "Authion" steam aviso (1st rank Ship-of-the-line Lieutenant Giraud)
 "Gulnara" steam avisio (1st rank Ship-of-the-line Lieutenant Sartorio)
 "Varo" armed transport ship (Ship-of-the-line Lieutenant Isola)
 "Dora" armed transport ship (Ship-of-the-line Lieutenant Riboty)
 "Tanaro" armed transport ship

Transport ships 
Transport ships:
 "San Michele" (Frigate Captain Riccardi di Netro)
 "Beroldo" (Frigate Captain Michelotti)
 "De Geneys" (Frigate Captain Galli della Mantica)  
 "Euridice" (Frigate Captain Teulada)
 "San Giovanni" (Corvette Captain Wright)
 "Aurora" (Ship-of-the-line Lieutenant Lampo)
 "Azzardoso" transport brigantine (Chief 1st Class Brun)

References

Military units and formations of the Crimean War
Military of the Kingdom of Sardinia
1850s in Italy
Orders of battle